Whiskey Springs is an unincorporated community in Mendocino County, California. The location was named teamsters stopping there during trips. In 1936, a fire suppression camp consisting of temporary structures was built at the site. The camp was constructed by the Civilian Conservation Corps. As of 1936, the spring itself provided a year-round flow of water. In 1974, the United States Forest Service conducted redwood regeneration tests at Whiskey Springs.

References

Unincorporated communities in California
Unincorporated communities in Mendocino County, California